Formed in 1936 at Smith College, the Smiffenpoofs are the oldest traditionally all-female collegiate a cappella group in the United States.  The group's founding came shortly after a group of Smithies attended a picnic with students from their brother school, Yale University, in Northampton, Massachusetts, where the Yale Whiffenpoofs performed. Inspired by this male a cappella group, a few ambitious Smithies returned to school determined to establish their own a cappella group. In honor of the Whiffenpoofs, they adopted a similar name.

Today, the Smiffenpoofs (affectionately known as "The Poofs") continue the a cappella tradition, maintaining a repertoire of old standards and contemporary music alike.  Performances at Smith and off campus at area colleges, alumnae gatherings, weddings, birthday parties, charity events, a cappella festivals, and much more keep the Smiffenpoofs busy throughout the school year with additional performances made possible during the summer months while on tour to various national and international destinations.  Most recently, the Smiffenpoofs' summer tour saw them traveling to Japan for two weeks.

The Smiffenpoofs were featured on the Best of College A Cappella (BOCA)’95 and the BOCA'97-'98 albums. “Landslide”(arr. Kirsten Campbell ‘95) and “Love Is a Battlefield” (arr. Anne Sulzmann ‘98) represented the group on these recordings.

Following their March 2, 2006 performance in Brattleboro, Vermont, the Smiffenpoofs were praised in the Brattleboro Reformer: "The Smiffenpoofs are as tight and refined as a group can be. They are champagne and caviar, Newport Beach and Rolls-Royce." The Smiffenpoofs’ arrangement of Imogen Heap’s "Hide and Seek" has also been described as "absolutely stunning", and the performance as "a sanctuary of calm, moving ensemble singing…just beautiful."

The Smiffenpoofs have built up a discography of several CDs and records over the past thirty years. Their brother a cappella group is The Brown Derbies.

Discography

 You've Gotta Have Everything... (1958)
Once Was A Time (1974)
Definitive Smiffenpoofs (1978)
After The Gold Rush (1981)
A Living Jukebox (1983)
Dining At The Ritz (1987)
In The Dark! (Live Album) 1988
Smiffenpoofs...Enough Said (1989)
 Bang, Pow, Poof! (1993)
 Get Out Of The House (1995)
 The Smiffenpoofs Have Left The Building (1997)
Twelve (1999)
 Testimony (2002)
 Bear Right At Tiny's (2006)
 Smiffenpoofs 75 (2011)
 Poofs in Boots (Live Album) (2012)
 Genesis of Rhythm: Smiffenpoofs 2013 (2013)
 XOXO, The Poofs (EP) (2015)

References

External links
https://thesmiffenpoofs.wixsite.com/website

Smith College
Collegiate a cappella groups
American vocal groups
Musical groups established in 1936
Girls' and women's choirs